Sheri Marina Markose  is a computational economist. She is a professor of Economics at the University of Essex, where she holds a personal chair since 2006. She is the founding director (2002-2009) of the Centre for Computational Finance and Economic Agents (CCFEA) at Essex. At CCFEA, with the support of the then Vice Chancellor, Ivor Crewe, she pioneered multi-disciplinary research as well as PhD and Masters programs, which include Agent-based computational economics, financial market modelling with extreme events and markets as complex adaptive systems.

Career and Work

Data Driven Multi-Agent Financial and Macro-net ModelsUnsustainable Global Macroeconomic Trends : New Granular Macro-net Models for Macroeconomics and Macro Prudential Policy 
Markose led the Essex component of a European Union project on Computational Optimization Methods in Statistics, Econometrics, and Finance.
This research relating to systemic risk in financial networks was presented at the October 2009 ECB workshop and IMF Conference on "Operationalizing Systemic Risk Monitoring" 26–28 May 2010. This led to the 2011 IMF project on Systemic Risk from Global Financial Derivatives Markets using network analysis.

In 2013, Markose was appointed as an academic advisor to the G20 OTC Derivatives Coordination Group of the Basel Committee on Banking Supervision and Financial Stability Board for the Macroeconomic Impact Assessment of OTC Derivatives Regulatory Reforms (MAGD). From 2011–2014, Markose was a Senior Consultant at the Financial Stability Unit of the Reserve Bank of India where she oversaw the digital mapping of the Indian financial system for systemic risk management.,. In the 2017 Banque de France Financial Stability Review, Markose and co-authors have provided an assessment of systemic risk from global derivatives markets following the 2009 G20 OTC derivatives reforms and also proposed a quantifiable measure of skin-in-the-game capital levies on Central Clearing Platforms. Markose was awarded the 2017 Eubank Prize by the Rice University, United States, "For integrative synthesis and data driven leadership toward understanding systemic risk in global financial markets". Markose has argued for why we need new models of the economy.

Electronic Fund Transfer,Slowdown In Monetary Base Growth and Inflation In Advanced Cashless Society 
In a 2003 paper, Markose with co-author Ying Jia Loke have shown that the slowdown in the growth of monetary base is governed by the levels of EFT at point of sale that led to a reduction in the transactions demand for cash in retail expenditures. Markose has argued that technology innovations in e-money that have revolutionized payments behaviour by substituting away from state supplied monetary base have brought about a permanent reduction in inflation in the retail price index.

Complex adaptive systems and Game Theory: Gödel's incompleteness theorems and Novelty Production by Digital Agents 
Since the 2005 Economic Journal article on Markets As Complex Adaptive Systems, Markose has underscored the relevance of Gödel logic for what has been held as the sine qua non of Complex Adaptive Systems, viz their capacity to produce novelty and surprises as in a Red Queen style arms race. Such innovation based structure changing arms races seen in the immune system, technology and regulator-regulatee arms races in economic systems are shown to correspond to undecidable Type 4 dynamics of the Wolfram-Chomsky schema. In Gödel logic, the Liar which represents a negation or a contrarian position is key to novelty production and heterogeneity. Markose has shown that in a Nash equilibrium, the only agent who needs to be ‘surprised’ is the Liar who will negate rules with predictable outcomes. Hence, this has implications for policy design and system failure.

In a 2017 publication in the American Institute of Mathematical Sciences (AIMS) Journal of Dynamics and Games, Markose focuses on how digital agents, which operate on encoded information, can innovate. The paper is original in postulating that innovation by digital agents relates to their recursive capacity to produce encoded objects outside machine listable sets as in the well-established set theoretic proof of Gödel incompleteness by Emil Leon Post (1944) which involves the productive function. In particular, Markose demonstrates that the Gödel sentence, which is a syntactic encoding of a self-referential statement that a code is under attack, far from being a ‘funky’ esoteric mathematical construction of little relevance beyond the foundations of mathematics, is an ubiquitous phenomenon which can be seen to be the driving force behind the complex protean phenotypes associated with genomic evolution and in the form of artifacts or extended phenotypes in organisms and humans. Digital agents which cannot do this, will be entrained within a fixed repertoire. Remarkably, with the discovery of human mirror neuron system, the Markose paper shows that there is evidence that the brain mechanisms behind human proteanism, which also include embodied offline simulation and operations that entail negation, correspond with the logical elements of Gödel incompleteness and Type 4 dynamics. Markose notes that models on strategic innovation and Type 4 dynamics, rampant in complex adaptive systems, are missing in game theory and most studies on complexity economics. In 2017, Markose has been appointed as an Associate Editor of Frontiers of Computational Intelligence.

Publications
Markose,S.M, 2017 (vol. 4, no. 3; #5 ),  Complex Type 4 Structure Changing Dynamics Of Digital Agents: Nash Equilibria Of A Game With Arms Race in Innovations, Journal of Dynamics and Games
Markose,S.M, Simone Giansante and Ali Rais Shaghaghi, 2017,  A systemic risk assessment of OTC derivatives reforms and skin‑in‑the‑game for CCPs,Banque de France Financial Stability Review
Markose,S.M, 2016, The Gödelian Foundations of Self-Reference, the Liar and Incompleteness: Arms Race in Complex Strategic Innovation
Markose,S.M, 2013, Systemic Risk Analytics: A Data Driven Multi-Agent Financial Network (MAFN) Approach Journal of Banking Regulation 14(3)
Markose,S.M, 2012, Systemic Risk from Global Financial Derivatives : A Network Analysis of Contagion and Its Mitigation with Super-Spreader Tax
Markose, S.M, and A. Alentorn, (2011) "The Generalized Extreme Value Distribution, Implied Tail Index, and Option Pricing" ,The Journal of Derivatives.
Markose, S.M, 2005, Computability and Evolutionary Complexity:Markets As Complex Adaptive Systems,Economic Journal
Markose, S.M and Y. J. Loke, April 2003, Network Effects On Cash-Card Substitution In Transactions and Low Interest Rate Regimes, Economic Journal.

References

External links 
 Sheri Markose's web page at University of Essex
 Markose's Agent-based Computational Economics research website
 Interview with Sheri Markose at Global Economic Symposium 2011
 Why we need new models of the economy(London School of Economics)
 Sheri Markose Invited Talk Given at Judge Business School, Cambridge 13-14 Sept 2016

Year of birth missing (living people)
Living people
Academics of the University of Essex
English economists
British women economists